P. Anil, also known as Douthyam Anil, is an Indian film director who works in Malayalam films. He is known for his action films. He is best known for directing the action adventure film Douthyam (1989).

Career
He made his debut as a director in 1986  with Adiverukal, starring Mohanlal. His other films with Mohanlal are Douthyam and  Sooryagayathri. Another of Anil's Mohanlal films, Brahmaa, was dropped after the first schedule. The same film was later remade by I. V. Sasi as The City with Suresh Gopi.

Filmography

As director

References

External links
 

Living people
Film directors from Kerala
Malayalam film directors
20th-century Indian film directors
Year of birth missing (living people)